İbrahim Zengin (1931 – 10 July 2013) was a Turkish wrestler. He was born in Amasya. He won the Olympic silver medal in Freestyle wrestling at his first Olympics in 1956. He also won a bronze medal at the 1951 World Wrestling Championships.

References

External links
 

1931 births
2013 deaths
People from Amasya
Olympic wrestlers of Turkey
Wrestlers at the 1956 Summer Olympics
Turkish male sport wrestlers
Olympic silver medalists for Turkey
Olympic medalists in wrestling
Medalists at the 1956 Summer Olympics
20th-century Turkish people
21st-century Turkish people